German submarine U-1278 was a Type VIIC/41 U-boat of Nazi Germany's Kriegsmarine during World War II.

She was ordered on 13 June 1942, and was laid down on 12 August 1943, at Bremer Vulkan AG, Bremen, as yard number 73. She was launched on 15 April 1944, and commissioned under the command of Oberleutnant zur See Erich Müller-Bethke on 31 May 1944.

Design
German Type VIIC/41 submarines were preceded by the heavier Type VIIC submarines. U-1278 had a displacement of  when at the surface and  while submerged. She had two shafts and two  propellers.

U-1278 was fitted with five  torpedo tubes (four fitted at the bow and one at the stern), fourteen torpedoes, one  SK C/35 naval gun, (220 rounds), one  Flak M42 and two  C/30 anti-aircraft guns. The boat had a complement of between forty-four and fifty-two.

Service history
U-1278 left on her first and only war patrol on 11 February 1945. At this time she was, and probably had been prior to, fitted with a Schnorchel underwater-breathing apparatus. She was sunk on 17 February 1945, by depth charges, killing all 48 of her crew.

See also
 Battle of the Atlantic

References

Notes

Citations

Bibliography 

Books

Online sources

External links
 

German Type VIIC/41 submarines
U-boats commissioned in 1944
U-boats sunk in 1945
World War II submarines of Germany
1944 ships
World War II shipwrecks in the Norwegian Sea
Ships built in Bremen (state)
Maritime incidents in February 1945